Pink Friday: Roman Reloaded, also known as just Roman Reloaded, is the second studio album by rapper Nicki Minaj. It was released on April 2, 2012, by Young Money, Cash Money and Universal Republic. Looking to transition from her debut studio album, Pink Friday (2010), Minaj wanted to make a follow-up record about "just having fun". Stylistically, the album is divided by a first half of hip hop tracks and a second half of dance-pop songs. As its executive producer, Minaj enlisted a variety of collaborators.

Upon its release, Pink Friday: Roman Reloaded received generally mixed reviews from music critics, who were ambivalent towards Minaj's exploration of dance-pop. It debuted at number one on the US Billboard 200 selling 253,000 copies in its first week. In doing so, it became Minaj's second number-one album in the country, and was additionally her first to debut in the peak position. The album was certified double platinum by the Recording Industry Association of America (RIAA) for combined album sales, track sales, on-demand audio and video streams equivalent of two million album-sale units. Internationally, the album peaked at number one in Canada and the United Kingdom, and reached the top five in Australia, Ireland, and New Zealand.

The album was promoted with six singles. Its lead single "Starships" peaked at number five on the US Billboard Hot 100. Follow-up singles "Right by My Side" and "Beez in the Trap" experienced moderate success on the Hot R&B/Hip-Hop Songs component chart. "Pound the Alarm" and "Va Va Voom" peaked at numbers fifteen and twenty-two on the Billboard Hot 100, respectively. "Automatic" was released as single only in France. The album was additionally promoted through the Pink Friday Tour and the Pink Friday: Reloaded Tour, which visited North America, Asia, Europe, and Oceania throughout May and December 2012. 

Pink Friday: Roman Reloaded was reissued under subtitle The Re-Up in November 2012. In addition to original album the reissue includes CD with seven new songs and one bonus track from deluxe edition of original album and extra DVD which was filmed during the Pink Friday Tour.

Background and development

Following the success of Minaj's debut studio album, Pink Friday (2010), Cash Money CEO, Brian "Birdman" Williams announced to Billboard that Minaj was aiming for a first quarter release in 2012. In November 2011, Minaj announced on Twitter that the album would be released on February 14, 2012, though it was later delayed to April 3, 2012. The album focuses on Roman Zolanski, one of Minaj's alter egos that was first featured on Pink Friday. The standard artwork was released on March 1, 2012, and the deluxe artwork was revealed on March 8, 2012, both through Twitter.

When Minaj was asked on Twitter to describe the album in one word, she tweeted "freedom". In an interview following the premiere of the album's lead single, "Starships", Minaj told Ryan Seacrest, "I've never had this much fun recording music in my life. My first album I was very guarded. I felt like I was making music to please everyone else. I had to be politically correct, but this album I am just creating music, and there's such a big difference. Literally in the studio we were cracking up laughing, having fun, and enjoying ourselves. The music itself you're going to get every side that I've ever shown and then a little bit extra. I've tried to make it very, very balanced, because I don't ever want to be boxed in, and that's always what drives me. So I made a very diverse album." She added that with her first album, "I was a too open Nicki Minaj. It felt more to me like a diary, the songs were more introspective and stuff like that...with this particular album I felt that it was time to give people a moment to enjoy the lyrics, and enjoy the beats, and enjoy the voices. When I was going to do my first album people would say, 'What is she going to talk about? Is she just going to talk about sex?' So I made it my business to make an album that did not talk about sex at all. I made it my business to make an album that wasn't a vulgar album, because [on] my mixtapes I was very, very...outlandish on my mixtapes. With this album I'm going back to not necessarily to that sound, but that feeling. The feeling of 'I don't care what you think!' That's what it is." Minaj also spoke on the concept behind her first two albums, saying: "Sometimes I felt the first album was a little too revealing, too emotional at times, and the other thing about your first album is that you’ve had all these emotions pent up inside to release and that's what you do on your debut. On the second album I was more concerned about just having fun".

As executive producer, Minaj enlisted a variety of producers, including Alex da Kid, Alex P, Pop & Oak, Benny Blanco, Blackout, Carl Falk, Cirkut, David Guetta, DJ Diamond Kuts, Dreamlab, Dr. Luke, Flip, Hitboy, Jimmy Joker, J.R. Rotem, Kane Beatz, Kenoe, KoOol Kojak, M.E. Productions, Pink Friday Productions, Rami Yacoub, RedOne, Rico Beats, Ryan & Smitty, Nikhil S. and T-Minus. Minaj also collaborated with different artists for the album, which includes: Cam’ron, Rick Ross, 2 Chainz, Lil Wayne, Nas, Drake, Young Jeezy, Chris Brown, Bobby V, and Beenie Man.

Composition
Stylistically, Pink Friday: Roman Reloaded is divided by the first half's hip hop tracks and the second half's dance-pop songs. Minaj raps in her unhinged alter ego "Roman Zolanski" over the former tracks' hard-edged beats and mostly sings on the latter half; she returns to rapping on the album's final track "Stupid Hoe".  Music journalist Jody Rosen delineates the album's music as comprising "'Side One' for the hip-hop headz, 'Side Two' for teenyboppers." Slant Magazine's Matthew Cole comments that the album is "partitioned almost exactly between a rap half and a pop half". Pitchfork Media's Ryan Dombal denotes the second half as tracks following "Roman Reloaded" and writes that they "range from brittle Euro-trance to milquetoast R&B to washed-out balladry." Music critic Kitty Empire cites the song "Pound the Alarm" as a "compromise" between the album's two stylistic halves.

Singles

Pink Friday: Roman Reloaded was promoted with five singles. "Starships" was released as the lead single from the album on February 14, 2012. The song was an international hit, peaking inside the top ten in over fifteen countries. In the United States, the song charted at number 5 on the Billboard Hot 100. The song is also Minaj's second most certified single to date.

"Right by My Side" was sent to US rhythmic radio and US urban radio on March 27, 2012, as the album's second single. The song, which features additional vocals from Chris Brown, has since peaked at number 51 on the Billboard Hot 100.

"Beez in the Trap", which features 2 Chainz, was sent to US rhythmic radio on May 29, 2012, as the third single from the album. The song peaked at number 48 on the Billboard Hot 100.

"Pound the Alarm" was released as the fourth single from the album. It was sent to US Top 40/Mainstream radio on July 17, 2012. The song peaked at number 15 on the Billboard Hot 100 as well as in the top ten in other countries including Australia, Canada and the UK.

"Va Va Voom" was released as the fifth single from the album. It was sent to BBC Radio 1 in the United Kingdom on September 12, 2012,  and to US Top 40/Mainstream radio on October 23, 2012.  The song peaked at number 22 on Billboard Hot 100 and in the top 20 in Canada and the UK.

"Automatic" impacted on French contemporary hit radio on October 18, 2012 as sixth and final single from the album.

Promotion
Minaj performed "Roman Holiday" at the 54th Grammy Awards on February 12, 2012, making Minaj the first solo female rapper to perform at the award show. The controversial performance borrowed elements of the classic horror film, The Exorcist. Minaj said in an interview with Rap-Up, "I had this vision for [alter-ego, Roman Zolanski] to be sort of exorcised—or actually he never gets exorcised—but people around him tell him he's not good enough because he's not normal, he's not blending in with the average Joe. And so his mother is scared and the people around him are afraid because they’ve never seen anything like him. He wanted to show that not only is he amazing and he's sure of himself and confident, but he's never gonna change, he's never gonna be exorcised. Even when they throw the holy water on him, he still rises above." MTV said the performance "was the most elaborate of the night's Grammy performances and had everyone talking."

On February 26, 2012, Minaj performed "Starships" live for the first time along with "Moment 4 Life", "Turn Me On" and "Super Bass" at the 2012 NBA All-Star Game. She also performed "Starships" on the eleventh season of American Idol on March 29, 2012. In April 2012, Minaj held album signings in New York City, Los Angeles, Philadelphia, and London. That month, she traveled to the UK for a week of promotion. On April 4, 2012, she performed a 40-minute mini-concert for BET's 106 & Park. She performed "Starships", "Right by My Side", and "Super Bass" in Times Square, hosted by Nokia, on April 7, 2012.
On April 19, 2012, HMV held a competition for fans, where 500 winners would get the chance to meet Minaj in one of their stores in Bayswater, London, where she would sign their albums. Minaj also made an appearance on The Graham Norton Show, which was aired on April 20, 2012, and on that same day, she visited BBC Radio 1 for an interview with Nick Grimshaw.

Tours
To further promote Pink Friday: Roman Reloaded, Minaj embarked on her first concert tour, entitled the Pink Friday Tour. The tour comprised 41 show dates, including, 19 in North America, 15 in Europe, 4 in Asia, and 3 in Oceania. The tour began in May 2012 with shows in Australia and Asia. The tour then continued on to Europe and North America in June, July, and August 2012. The tour came to a close on August 14, 2012, in New York City at the Roseland Ballroom. The final show was a part of a free Pepsi promotional concert.

The tour was officially announced by Minaj on May 1, 2012, featuring a stage resembling Barbie Dreamhouse. Minaj stated that she will play radio and outdoor festivals in conduction with arenas and theaters. She described the tour as being "intimate yet big". Laurieann Gibson served as creative director and choreographer for the tour. Minaj also embarked on the Pink Friday: Reloaded Tour, which visited arenas throughout October and December 2012, to further promote the album and its reissue The Re-Up.

Critical reception

Pink Friday: Roman Reloaded received mixed reviews from critics. At Metacritic, which assigns a normalized rating out of 100 to reviews from mainstream publications, the album received an average score of 60, based on 30 reviews. Although he complimented its first half as "an amusement park for production lovers", AllMusic editor David Jeffries criticized the album's "iffy pop" and called it "a frustrating mix of significant and skippable." Randall Roberts of the Los Angeles Times commended its "minimal, bouncy hip-hop tracks" for highlighting Minaj's "charm and achievement", but wrote that the "disjointed, artistically confused" album "drives off a cliff" with "dance pop songs as simple as they are generic". Emily Mackay of NME found its disparate music "just baffling" and "zany for the sake of it". Kitty Empire, writing in The Observer, interpreted Minaj's pop songs as "an aggressive bid for [Lady] Gaga's territory." David Amidon of PopMatters accused Minaj of "doubling down on her cartoonish elements" and criticized its first half as "very poorly thought out rap music masquerading as pop". John Calvert of The Quietus described the album as "pop postmodernity in an advanced state of hollow, banal meaningless[ness]" and felt that the pop songs have "absolutely nothing to do with Minaj's art". Slant Magazines Matthew Cole panned it as a "mediocre rap album" and felt that "Minaj conveys no personality" when she does not rap. "Too many of its 19 tracks leave Minaj simply treading the territory of other radio divas", wrote Kyle Anderson in Entertainment Weekly.

In a positive review for Rolling Stone, journalist Jody Rosen called it a "filler-free mega-pop album" and commented that "the energy never flags". Jessica Hopper of Spin praised Minaj's "rap offerings" as "nearly flawless" and wrote of the album's portion of pop tracks, "Her artistic potency dissolves, and she's just another well-finessed quirky diva". Tom Ewing of The Guardian said that it "doesn't matter" that the album is inconsistent and "makes no attempt to marry its rap and pop impulses ... at their best the styles are wedded anyway by a particular frenzy, a sense that Minaj comes with no off switch or lower gear." Robert Christgau said in his review for MSN Music that Minaj "raps exceptionally well, sings quite well, rhymes inconsistently but sometimes superbly", and that the album's deluxe edition starts and ends "strong", with a "fun" middle that veers between "mawkish and loud". Christgau recommended it to listeners who "enjoy contemporary pop whose market-tested blare offends both rockist philistines and IDM aesthetes".

Commercial performance
Pink Friday: Roman Reloaded debuted at number one on the US Billboard 200 chart, selling 253,000 copies in its first week, for the week ending April 10, 2012. This marked Minaj's second number-one album in that country following her previous studio album, Pink Friday (2010), which peaked at number one in February 2011. On June 22, 2012, Pink Friday: Roman Reloaded was certified platinum by the Recording Industry Association of America (RIAA), for shipments of one million copies in the U.S. The album sold 785,000 copies throughout 2012 in the US. Pink Friday: Roman Reloaded was the best selling rap album released in 2012 in the US, and overall the album was the third highest-selling R&B/Hip-Hop album of 2012 in the US. According to the International Federation of the Phonographic Industry (IFPI), Pink Friday: Roman Reloaded was the 25th best-selling album globally of 2012, with sales of 1.4 million copies worldwide during that year. As of February 2015, Pink Friday: Roman Reloaded has sold 905,000 copies in the US. On March 22, 2016, the album was certified double platinum by the RIAA for combined album sales, track sales, on-demand audio, and video streams equivalent of two million album-sale units.

Pink Friday: Roman Reloaded debuted at number one on the UK Albums Chart and the UK R&B Albums Chart, with first week sales of 47,000 copies. In doing so, Pink Friday: Roman Reloaded became the first album by a female rap artist to chart at number one in the United Kingdom. Additionally, the album sold 242,000 copies in the UK throughout 2012, making it the thirty-seventh best selling album of that year. Pink Friday: Roman Reloaded also debuted at number one on the Canadian Albums Chart, and debuted at number five on the Australian Albums Chart. In Mexico, the album reached the top 40 in its first week of release.

Track listing
Credits adapted from the liner notes of Pink Friday: Roman Reloaded.

Notes
"Turn Me On" is excluded from some of the album pressing.

Personnel
Credits adapted from the liner notes of Pink Friday: Roman Reloaded.

Nicki Minaj – executive producer
Martin Sandberg – vocals
Carl Falk – guitar, producer, vocals, mixing, instrumentation
Wayne Hector – vocals
Jeanette Olsson – vocals (Background)
Ariel Chobaz – engineer, vocal editing, vocal producer, mixing
RedOne – vocals (background), producer, instrumentation, vocal editing
Marissa Bregman – vocals
Rachael Findlen – vocals
Patrizia Valentina – vocals
Eve Boase – vocals
Kalenna Harper – vocals
Kelly Sheehan – vocals
Teddy Sky – vocals (Background)
Rutger "Ruffi" Kroese – vocal mixing
Bilal "The Chef" Hajji – vocals (background)
AJ Junior – vocals (background)
Mohombi – vocals
Joshua Berkman – A&R coordinator
Dwayne "Tha President" Carter – executive producer
David Levy – engineer
Finis "KY" – white engineer
Koool – Kojak programming, producer, instrumentation
Rami – producer, mixing, instrumentation, vocal editing
Noah Shebib – engineer
Alex Da Kid – producer
Gelly Kusuma – engineer
Alex P – producer, engineer, vocal editing, instrumentation
Brian "Big Bass" Gardner – mastering
Donald "Tixie" Dixon – engineer
Stuart White – engineer
T-Minus – producer
Ronald "Slim Tha Don" Williams – executive producer
Donnie Meadows – production coordination
Michael "Banger" Cadahia – engineer
Elizabeth Gallardo – recording assistant
Bryan "Baby Birdman" Williams – executive producer
Trevor Muzzy – engineer, mixing, vocal editing
Noel Cadastre – recording assistant
Cortez Bryant – executive producer
Josh Thomas – producer, writer
Black Raw – mastering, mixing, additional production
Safaree "SB" Samuels – executive producer, A&R coordinator
Pop Wansel – producer
Rico Beats – producer
Clint Gibbs – recording assistant
Smitty – producer
Kidus "K Duece" Henok – A&R coordinator
Lukasz Gottwald – vocals
Jimmy Joker – producer, instrumentation
Katie Mitzell – production coordination
Cirkut – programming, instrumentation, producer
Scott "Yarmov" Yarmovsky – production coordination
Jermaine Preyan – executive producer
Ryan – producer
Jon Sher – mixing assistant, recording assistant
Jahshari Wilson – cover design
JusIce Beatz – producer
Nikhil Seethram – producer
JProof – producer
Flippa123 – producer
DJ Diamond Kuts – producer
Tim Roberts – mixing assistant
Serban Ghenea – mixing
John Rivers – engineer
Kane – producer
Benny Blanco – programming, producer, instrumentation
Blackout – producer
Hype Williams – photography
Ke'Noe – producer
Dr. Luke – programming, producer, instrumentation
David Guetta – producer
Phil Seaford – mixing assistant
Nicholas Cooper – vocal producer
Tanisha Broadwater – production coordination
J.R. Rotem – producer
Irene Richter – production coordination
Giorgio Tuinfort – producer
Dream – lab producer
Hit Boy – producer

Charts

Weekly charts

Year-end charts

Certifications

Release history

References

2012 albums
Albums produced by Alex da Kid
Albums produced by Benny Blanco
Albums produced by Cirkut
Albums produced by David Guetta
Albums produced by Dreamlab
Albums produced by Dr. Luke
Albums produced by Hit-Boy
Albums produced by J. R. Rotem
Albums produced by Kane Beatz
Albums produced by RedOne
Albums produced by T-Minus (record producer)
Cash Money Records albums
Nicki Minaj albums
Sequel albums
Young Money Entertainment albums
Albums produced by Fernando Garibay
Albums produced by Oak Felder